Culex elegans is a species of mosquitoes in the subfamily Culicinae. Insectoid.info treats the name as a separated species, whereas Encyclopedia of Life lists it as a synonym for Aedes aegypti. Ian Macdonald described it in 1899 as not associated with malaria.

It is described from Italy and Spain.

References

External links 

 Culex elegans at Encyclopedia of Life
 Culex elegans at insectoid.info

elegans
Insects described in 1889